Al Hajar is a village in the northern region of the Kingdom of Bahrain, west of the village of Al Qadam and lines the Budaiya highway.

History
Ancient relics were discovered in the village in 1988 and are believed to be from the Dilmun civilisation from 2300 BC. The village has its own youth football club.

References

Populated places in the Northern Governorate, Bahrain